University of Frankfurt may refer to:

 Goethe University Frankfurt (originally Universität Frankfurt am Main), in Frankfurt am Main, Hesse, Germany
 Viadrina European University or University of Frankfurt (Oder), in Frankfurt/Oder, Brandenburg, Germany